The British nobility is made up of the peerage and the (landed) gentry. The nobility of its four constituent home nations has played a major role in shaping the history of the country, although the hereditary peerage now retain only the rights to stand for election to the House of Lords, dining rights there, position in the formal order of precedence, the right to certain titles, and the right to an audience (a private meeting) with the monarch. More than a third of British land is in the hands of aristocrats and traditional landed gentry.

Peerage

The British nobility in the narrow sense consists of members of the immediate families of peers who bear courtesy titles or honorifics. Members of the peerage carry the titles of duke, marquess, earl, viscount or baron. British peers are sometimes referred to generically as lords, although individual dukes are not so styled when addressed or by reference.

All modern British honours, including peerage dignities, are created directly by the Crown and take effect when letters patent are issued, affixed with the Great Seal of the Realm. The Sovereign is considered to be the fount of honour and, as "the fountain and source of all dignities cannot hold a dignity from himself", cannot hold a British peerage.

Landed gentry

Descendants in the male line of peers and children of women who are peeresses in their own right, as well as baronets, knights, dames and certain other persons who bear no peerage titles, belong to the landed gentry, deemed members of the non-peerage nobility below whom they rank. The untitled nobility consists of all those who bear formally matriculated, or recorded, armorial bearings. CILANE and the Sovereign Military Order of Malta both consider armorial bearings as the main, if not sole, mark of nobility in Britain.

Other than their designation, such as Gentleman or Esquire, they enjoy only the privilege of a position in the formal orders of precedence in the United Kingdom. The largest portion of the British aristocracy has historically been the landed gentry, made up of baronets and the non-titled armigerous landowners whose families hailed from the medieval feudal class (referred to as gentlemen due to their income solely deriving from land ownership).

Non-hereditary nobility 
It is often wrongly assumed that knighthoods and life peerages cannot grant hereditary nobility. The bestowal of a peerage or a knighthood is seen as due reason for a grant of arms by Garter King of Arms or Lord Lyon, and thus, those who make use of it attain hereditary nobility. The eldest son of a Knight and his eldest sons in perpetuity attain the rank of Esquire.

The only form of non-hereditary nobility in Great Britain is that associated with certain offices, which give the rank of Gentleman for the duration of tenure, or for life. Some offices and ranks also give the rank of Esquire for life.

Ennoblement 
The Monarch grants Peerages, Baronetcies and Knighthoods (nowadays mostly Life Peerages and Knighthoods) to citizens of the United Kingdom and Commonwealth Realms at the advice of the Prime Minister. Honours lists are published regularly at important occasions.

Untitled nobility, i.e. gentility, being identical to armigerousness, falls into the jurisdiction of the College of Arms and Lyon Court. Part of the Monarch's fons honorum—the power to grant arms—has been de facto devolved to Garter King of Arms and Lord Lyon King of Arms, respectively. A grant of arms is in every regard equivalent to a patent of nobility on the Continent; depending on jurisdiction and circumstances it can be seen as either an act of ennoblement or a confirmation of nobility.

Thus, along with Belgium and Spain, the United Kingdom remains one of the few countries in which nobility is still granted and the nobility (except for the hereditary peerage and baronetage) does not form a closed, purely "historical" class.

History

Middle Ages 
In late Anglo-Saxon England, the most powerful secular magnates were earls. Originally an office evolving from the earlier ealdorman, earls were second only to the king in authority and governed multi-shire regions whose responsibilities included keeping the peace, dispensing justice, and raising armies in the king's name. During Edward the Confessor's reign (1042–1066), there were four principal earldoms: Wessex, Mercia, Northumbria, and East Anglia. By 1154, the earldom had lost its original character as a royal office and was an honorary title.

Below the earl was the thegn. Thegns were the leaders of local society, described by historian David Carpenter as "the country gentry of Anglo-Saxon England". The most important thegns served in the royal household, while others might serve a powerful lord. They gave judgment in the shire courts and formed the core of the royal armies. The sheriff was usually a local thegn. In 1066, there was an estimated 5,000 thegns in England. Earls and thegns, along with bishops and abbots, advised the king in the Witan.

After the Norman Conquest of 1066, the old Anglo-Saxon nobility was replaced by an Anglo-Norman aristocracy. The baronage—consisting of between 150 to 250 feudal barons—was the highest rank within the medieval nobility.  Originally, the word baron described a social status, not a title. A small number of barons were granted the title of earl, which was the only hereditary title in England before 1337. The lower ranks of the nobility consisted of the knightly class or gentry, which numbered around 3,000 landholders by 1300. Half of these were dubbed knights, while the other half were styled esquire. The banneret was ranked below a baron but above a regular knight. There was overlap between the gentry and the "lesser barons".

The baronage (including barons, earls, and high-ranking churchmen) had a duty as tenants-in-chief to provide the king with advice when summoned to great councils. During the reign of Henry III (1216–1272), the great council evolved into Parliament, a representative body that increasingly asserted for itself the right to consent to taxation. Initially, participation in Parliament was still determined by one's status as a tenant-in-chief. Earls and greater barons received a writ of summons issued directly from the king, while lesser barons were summoned through the local sheriffs. In the reign of Edward I (1272–1307), the first hereditary barons were created by writ. Overtime, baronies by writ became the main method of creating baronies, and baronies by tenure became obsolete.

20th century
Non-hereditary positions began to be created again in 1867 for Law Lords. In 1958, the Life Peerages Act 1958 enabled (non-hereditary) life peers to sit in the House of Lords, and from then on the creation of hereditary peerages rapidly became obsolete, almost ceasing after 1964. This is only a convention, and was not observed by prime minister Margaret Thatcher, who asked the Queen to create three hereditary peerages (two of them, to men who had no heirs). Until changes in the twentieth century, only a proportion of those holding Scottish and Irish peerages were entitled by that title to sit in the House of Lords; these were nominated by their peers.

Until constitutional reforms soon after Tony Blair came to power (the House of Lords Act 1999), possession of a title in the peerage (except Irish) entitled its holder to a seat in the House of Lords. Since then, only 92 hereditary peers are entitled to sit in the House of Lords, of which 90 are elected by the hereditary peers by ballot and replaced on death. The two exceptions are the Earl Marshal (a position held by the Dukes of Norfolk), who is responsible for certain ceremonial functions on state occasions, and the Lord Great Chamberlain (a position held in gross and one of a number of persons can hold it), who serves as the monarch's representative in Parliament and accompanies them on certain state occasions; both are automatically entitled to sit in the House. Typically, those due to inherit a peerage—or indeed have done so, in recent times—have been educated at one of the major public schools, such as Eton, Radley, Oundle, Winchester or Harrow.

A member of the House of Lords cannot simultaneously be a member of the House of Commons. In 1960, Anthony Wedgwood Benn inherited his father's title as Viscount Stansgate. He fought and won the ensuing by-election, but was disqualified from taking his seat until the Peerage Act 1963 was passed enabling hereditary peers to renounce their titles. Titles, while often considered central to the upper class, are not always strictly so. Both Captain Mark Phillips and Vice-Admiral Sir Timothy Laurence, the respective first and second husbands of Princess Anne, do not hold peerages. Most members of the British upper class are untitled.

Noble titles

Dukes
Dukes in the United Kingdom
List of dukes in the peerages of Britain and Ireland
List of dukedoms in the peerages of Britain and Ireland

Marquesses
Marquesses in the United Kingdom
List of marquesses in the peerages of Britain and Ireland
List of marquessates in the peerages of Britain and Ireland

Earls
Royal earldoms in the United Kingdom
List of earls in the peerages of Britain and Ireland
List of earldoms

Viscounts
List of viscounts in the peerages of Britain and Ireland
List of viscountcies in the peerages of Britain and Ireland

Barons/Lords of Parliament of Scotland
Royal baronies in the United Kingdom
List of barons in the peerages of Britain and Ireland
List of baronies in the peerages of Britain and Ireland
List of life peerages

Names adopted for titles of honour
The name adopted by the grantee of a title of nobility originally was the name of his seat or principal manor, which often had also been adopted as his surname, for example the Berkeley family seated at Berkeley Castle had the surname "de Berkeley" ("from Berkeley") and gained the title Baron Berkeley, amongst many others. Dukes were originally named after counties, the earliest one being Duke of Cornwall (1337) followed by Duke of Norfolk (1483) and Duke of Somerset (1547). The Duke of Wellington (1814) is an early example of a dukedom being named after a mere village, or manor, after Wellington in Somerset.

Earls, being in reality the "Count" of Continental Europe, were also named after the County over which they exercised control. The range of names adopted for titles gradually expanded from territorial names alone. Later titles used a wide variety of names, including surname (unrelated to territorial designation indicated by the French particule de), for example in 1547 Richard Rich, 1st Baron Rich. Edward Russell in 1697 was created Viscount Barfleur after a naval victory in foreign territory, setting a precedent which has been repeatedly followed. Later earldoms also adopted family names, and omitted the preposition "of", an early example being 
Earl Rivers created in 1466 for Richard Woodville, 1st Baron Rivers. The title was not derived from the name of a place, but from the family name de Redvers, or Reviers, Earls of Devon. Earl Ferrers was created in 1711 for Robert Shirley, 14th Baron Ferrers, whose earlier title was named after the de Ferrers family, or Norman origin. Another early example of a surname being used as a title is  Earl Poulett (1706).

Modern life peers do not generally own large estates, from which to name their title, so more imagination is required, unless the simple option of using the surname is selected.

Gentry titles and styles

Baronets (styled as Sir)
List of baronetcies

Hereditary knights (styled as Sir)
Knight of Kerry

Knights (styled as Sir)
Knight, from Old English cniht ("boy" or "servant"), a cognate of the German word Knecht ("labourer" or "servant").
British honours system

Dames
Dame

Non-peerage nobility 
Barons in Scotland
Noblesse

Clan chiefs/Lairds
Clan chief
Laird

Untitled members of the gentry
Esquire (ultimately from Latin , in the sense of shield bearer, via Old French ) - comparable to the French-Belgian ecuyer, Dutch jonkheer and German Edler
Gentleman - the lowest rank and lowest common denominator of British nobility

Irish and Gaelic nobility

Outside the United Kingdom, the remaining Gaelic nobility of Ireland continue informally to use their provincial titles, few are recognised as royal extraction by the British Royal Family such as O'Donovan family. As Ireland was nominally under the overlordship of the English Crown for between the 12th and 16th centuries, the Gaelic system coexisted with the British system. A modern survivor of this coexistence is the Baron Inchiquin, still referred to in Ireland as the Prince of Thomond. The Prince of Thomond is one of three remaining claimants to the non-existent, since the 12th century, High Kingship of Ireland, the others being The O'Neill, MacCarthy Mor dynasty and the O'Conor Don.

Chief of the Name was a clan designation which was effectively terminated in 1601 with the collapse of the Gaelic order, and which, through the policy of surrender and regrant, eliminated the role of a chief in a clan or sept structure. This does not mean there is no longer a Chief or a sept today. Contemporary individuals today designated or claiming a title of an Irish chief treat their title as hereditary, whereas chiefs in the Gaelic order were nominated and elected by a vote of their kinsmen. Modern "chiefs" of tribal septs descend from provincial and regional kings with pedigrees beginning in Late Antiquity, whereas Scottish chiefly lines arose well after the formation of the Kingdom of Scotland, (with the exception of the Clann Somhairle, or Clan Donald and Clan MacDougall, the two of royal origins). The related Irish Mór ("Great") is sometimes used by the dominant branches of the larger Irish dynasties to declare their status as the leading princes of the blood, e.g.MacCarthy Mor dynasty, lit. (The) Great Macarthy or 
Ó Néill Mór, lit. (The) Great O'Neill.

Following the Norman invasion of Ireland several Hiberno-Norman families adopted Gaelic customs, the most prominent being the De Burgh dynasty and FitzGerald dynasty; their use of Gaelic customs did not extend to their titles of nobility, as they continuously utilized titles granted under the authority of the English monarchy.

Jewish nobility

Gallery

See also
British Royal Family
Forms of address in the United Kingdom
Gentry
Honourable
List of British monarchs
Noblesse
Orders, decorations, and medals of the United Kingdom
Order of precedence in England and Wales
Peerage, an exposition of great detail
Peerage of England
Peerage of Great Britain
Peerage of Ireland
Peerage of Scotland
Peerage of the United Kingdom
British Public Schools
Welsh peers and baronets

Notes

Citations

References

Further reading
 Cannadine, David. The Decline and Fall of the British Aristocracy (1999)
 Collins, Marcus. "The fall of the English gentleman: the national character in decline, c. 1918–1970." Historical Research 75.187 (2002): 90-111 online.
 Lipp, Charles, and Matthew P. Romaniello, eds. Contested spaces of nobility in early modern Europe (Ashgate, 2013).
 Manning, Brian. "The nobles, the people, and the constitution." Past & Present 9 (1956): 42-64 online during 17th century.
 Stone, Lawrence. “The Anatomy of the Elizabethan Aristocracy.” Economic History Review, 18#1/2, 1948, pp. 1–53. online
 Trevor-Roper, H. R. “The Elizabethan Aristocracy: An Anatomy Anatomized.” Economic History Review 3#3 1951, pp. 279–298. online
 Stone, Lawrence. “The Elizabethan Aristocracy-A Restatement.” Economic History Review, 4#3 1952, pp. 302–321. online, a famous controversy

External links
 The Aristocracy, BBC Radio 4 discussion with David Cannadine, Rosemary Sweet & Felipe Fernandez-Armesto (In Our Time, Jun. 19, 2003)